The 2008–09 season was East Bengal's 2nd season in the I-League and 89th season in existence.

Competitions

Overall

Overview

Calcutta Football League

East Bengal finished the 2008 Calcutta Premier Division in 3rd place with 25 points from 14 matches behind champions Mohun Bagan and runners-up Mohammedan Sporting.

Fixtures & results

I League

League table

Fixtures & results

Federation Cup

East Bengal started the Federation Cup campaign as defending champions and was allotted into Group C alongside JCT, New Delhi Heroes and Sporting Club de Goa. East Bengal won all the group matches and reached the semi-finals where they lost to their arch-rivals Mohun Bagan in the penalty shoot-out after the game ended 1–1 in regulation time.

Group C

Fixtures & results

Statistics

Appearances
Players with no appearances are not included in the list.

Goal scorers

References

East Bengal Club seasons